Bulbophyllum medusae, commonly known as the Medusa orchid, is a species of epiphytic orchid with a creeping rhizome and a single leaf about  long emerging from the top of each pseudobulb. The flowers are creamy yellow and arranged in clusters of about fifteen arranged in a circle at the tip of the flowering stem. The flowers have an unpleasant odour.

The Medusa orchid was first formally described in 1861 by John Lindley who gave it the name Cirrhopetalum medusae and published the description in Edwards's Botanical Register. In 1861, Heinrich Gustav Reichenbach changed the name to Bulbophyllum medusae.

References

External links 

medusae
Epiphytic orchids
Orchids of Malaya
Orchids of Thailand
Orchids of Borneo
Plants described in 1842